Oorah Kiruv Rechokim, Inc ("awaken and bring in those who are far"), better known as Oorah is an incorporated Orthodox Jewish outreach (kiruv) organization, founded in 1980 "with the goal of awakening Jewish children and their families to their heritage." It is a United States-based 501(C)3 non-profit organization. Joy For Our Youth, a subsidiary of Oorah, has been labeled a "hareidi missionary organization" that uses deceptive adveritising. Quoting an article by Bill Smith in the St. Louis Post-Dispatch, RipoffReports.com criticized Kars4Kids, Joy For Our Youth and Oorah for their "questionable business practices."

History
Oorah, Inc. was founded by Rabbi Chaim Mintz and is based in Lakewood. Day-to-day operations are overseen by his son, Rabbi Eliyohu Mintz of New Jersey.

Programs
Oorah operates and/or funds 49 individual programs that target Jewish outreach (Kiruv) and learning, family support, personal growth, and relationship counseling. It promotes family support and development. It runs summer camps for boys and girls, Jewish holiday enrichment, early, primary, and secondary educational support and enrichment, as examples.  One of their main programs involves an anthropomorphic $5 bill, named Fiveish, who is characterised by positive Jewish behaviours.

Legal issues and hacks
In the summer of 2007, 31 undocumented workers doing work for a subcontractor at Oorah's summer camp were arrested in a raid by ICE and local law enforcement. Camp director Eliyohu Mintz stated that the organization was not aware that the workers lacked employment authorization.

In September 2010, a website for some of Oorah's camps was hacked.

References

External links
 

Orthodox Jewish outreach
Orthodox Judaism in New Jersey
Jewish organizations based in the United States
Non-profit organizations based in New Jersey
501(c)(3) organizations
Jewish organizations established in 1980
1980 establishments in New Jersey
Lakewood Township, New Jersey